Buchenavia iguaratensis is a species of plant in the Combretaceae family. It is endemic to Brazil.  It is threatened by habitat loss.

References

Flora of Brazil
iguaratensis
Endangered plants
Taxonomy articles created by Polbot
Taxobox binomials not recognized by IUCN